The Michigan State Spartans football statistical leaders are individual statistical leaders of the Michigan State Spartans football program in various categories, including passing, rushing, total offense, receiving, defensive stats, kicking, and scoring. Within those areas, the lists identify single-game, Single season and career leaders. The Spartans represent Michigan State University in the NCAA's Big Ten Conference.

Although Michigan State began competing in intercollegiate football in 1896, the school's official record book considers the "modern era" to have begun in 1945. Records from before this year are often incomplete and inconsistent, and they are generally not included in these lists.

These lists are dominated by more recent players for several reasons:
 Since 1945, seasons have increased from 10 games to 11 and then 12 games in length.
 The NCAA didn't allow freshmen to play varsity football until 1972 (with the exception of the World War II years), allowing players to have four-year careers.
 Bowl games only began counting toward single-season and career statistics in 2002. The Spartans have played in 10 bowl games since then.
 Similarly, the Spartans have played in the Big Ten Championship Game three times since it began in 2011, so players in those seasons had 14 games to accumulate statistics.
 Due to COVID-19 disruptions, the NCAA ruled that the 2020 season would not be counted against any football player's athletic eligibility, giving players active in that season five years of eligibility instead of the standard four.

These lists are updated through Michigan State's game against Ohio State on November 20, 2021.

Passing

Passing yards

{| class="wikitable"
|+ Single Game
|-

|-
|1||Brian Lewerke||445||2017|| style="font-size:80%;" |Northwestern
|-
|2||Bill Burke||400||1999|| style="font-size:80%;" |Michigan
|-
||||Brian Lewerke||400||2017|| style="font-size:80%;|Penn State
|-
|4||Connor Cook||398 ||2015|| style="font-size:80%;" |Indiana
|-
|5||Jeff Smoker||376||2001|| style="font-size:80%;" |Fresno State
|-
|6||Ed Smith||369||1978|| style="font-size:80%;" |Indiana
|-
|7||Connor Cook||367 ||2015|| style="font-size:80%;" |Rutgers
|-
|8||Jim Miller||360||1993|| style="font-size:80%;" |Ohio State
|-
|9||Connor Cook||358||2014|| style="font-size:80%;" |Ohio State
|-
|10||Jeff Smoker||357||2003|| style="font-size:80%;" |Penn State
|-
|}

Passing touchdowns

Rushing

Rushing yards

Rushing touchdowns

Receiving

Receptions

Receiving yards

Receiving touchdowns

Total offense
Total offense is the sum of passing and rushing statistics. It does not include receiving or returns.

Total offense yards

Touchdowns responsible for
"Touchdowns responsible for" is the official NCAA term for combined passing and rushing touchdowns.

Michigan State's record book does not list single-game leaders in this category.

Defense

Interceptions

Tackles

Sacks

Kicking

Field goals made

Field goal percentage

Scoring
Michigan State's most recent record book (2021) does not break down leaders over any time frame (career, single-season, game) by type of score. Some leaders' breakdowns can be extrapolated from information included in the record book, or from other sources.

Total points

Total touchdowns
These lists include touchdowns scored'' by each individual player, thus including rushing, receiving, and return touchdowns but not passing touchdowns. Michigan State does not break down its lists of total touchdown leaders by type of play.

References

Lists of college football statistical leaders by team
Statistical Leaders
Michigan sports-related lists